Pycnanthemum torreyi, common name Torrey's mountainmint, is a perennial plant native to the United States.

Conservation status in the United States
It is listed as endangered in Connecticut, Illinois, Maryland, New Hampshire, New Jersey, New York (state)  and Pennsylvania. It is listed as a special concern in Tennessee.

References

Flora of the United States
torreyi